Sweden was represented by Blond in the Eurovision Song Contest 1997 with the song "Bara hon älskar mig".

Before Eurovision

Melodifestivalen 1997 
Melodifestivalen 1997 was the selection for the 37th song to represent Sweden at the Eurovision Song Contest. It was the 36th time that this system of picking a song had been used. 1,229 songs were submitted to SVT for the competition. The final was held in the SVT Studios in Gothenburg on 8 March 1997, presented by Jan Jingryd and was broadcast on SVT2 and Sveriges Radio's P3 network. The show was watched by 2,965,000 people. The winner was chosen by 11 regional juries, being "Bara hon älskar mig" performed by Blond. It was written and composed by Stephan Berg.

At Eurovision 
Heading into the final of the contest, RTÉ reported that bookmakers ranked the entry 12th out of the 25 entries. Blond performed 16th on the night of the contest and received 36 points, placing 14th.

Voting

References

External links
TV broadcastings at SVT's open archive

1997
Countries in the Eurovision Song Contest 1997
1997
Eurovision
Eurovision
Melodifestivalen contestants of 1997